The Make-A-Wish Foundation is a 501(c)(3) nonprofit organization founded in the United States that helps fulfill the wishes of children with a critical illness between the ages of  and 18 years old.
Make-A-Wish was founded in 1980 and is headquartered in Phoenix. The organization operates through its 59 chapters located throughout the United States. Make-A-Wish also operates in nearly 50 other countries around the world through 39 international affiliates.

History
In the spring of 1980, 7-year-old Christopher James Greicius (August 13, 1972 – May 3, 1980) was being treated for leukemia. He aspired to be a police officer. U.S. Customs Officer Tommy Austin befriended Chris and worked with Frank Shankwitz and officers at the Arizona Department of Public Safety to plan an experience to lift Greicius' spirits. Chris spent the day as a police officer, rode in a police helicopter, received a custom-tailored police uniform, and was sworn in as the first honorary Public Safety patrolman in state history. Greicius died soon after, but his wish became the inspiration for the Make-A-Wish organization.

Process 

Children who may be eligible to receive a wish can be referred by one of the following four sources: 
 A medical professional treating the child (typically a provider (MD, DO, PA or NP), nurse, social worker or child-life specialist)
 The child's parents or legal guardians
 Another member of the wish kid's family with current and complete information about the child's medical condition and treatment 
 The potential wish kid

To refer a child, the appropriate referral source can use the Make-A-Wish online referral form or contact the Make-A-Wish chapter closest to them. All medical information is considered confidential and is not discussed with outside parties unless it is required for the wish and the child's parent(s) or guardian(s) have given their consent.

A child with a critical illness who has reached the age of 2 and is under the age of 18 at the time of referral is potentially eligible for a wish. After a child is referred, Make-A-Wish staff work with each child's healthcare team to determine if a child is medically eligible for a wish, based on the medical criteria established by Make-A-Wish. In addition, a child cannot have received a wish from another wish-granting organization.

Each Make-A-Wish chapter follows specific policies and guidelines for granting a child's wish. Make-A-Wish works closely with the wish child's physician and family to determine the most appropriate time to grant the wish, keeping in mind the child's treatment protocol or other concerns. Most wish requests fall into five categories: I wish to go, I wish to be, I wish to meet, I wish to have, or I wish to give.

Professional wrestler John Cena holds the title for the most wishes granted by a single individual, at over 650 wishes.

On June 24, 2022, Disney Cruise Line honored all Make-A-Wish children as godchildren of the Disney Wish.

Governance and accountability

The national board of directors helps chart Make-A-Wish's course. The board determines the organization's mission and vision, evaluates and supports the president and chief executive officer, and protects Make-A-Wish's assets. The board also enhances Make-A-Wish's public standing, ensures accountability, maintains legal integrity, and assesses its own performance.

The senior leadership team is composed of Make-A-Wish's top-level management. Each member is a national office leader in disciplines that include wish-granting, fundraising, legal, brand advancement, and operational activities. The president and CEO guides the strategic plan in areas such as board development, talent development, fundraising, and corporate relations.

The Charity Navigator gave Make-A-Wish a 2-star overall rating, a 1-star financial rating and a 4-star accountability and transparency rating for the 2019 fiscal year.

Hunting and fishing

Make-A-Wish stopped granting wishes involving hunting-related activities, including fishing, use of firearms or other weapons that are designed to cause animal injury in 1996. This was largely due to concerns over child safety, the pressure from animal-sensitive donors, and criticisms from animal rights groups. In response, three organizations were formed: Hunt of a Lifetime, which arranges hunting trips for terminally ill children; Catch-a-Dream, which was conceived by Mississippi outdoorsman Bruce Brady and formed by his loved ones following Brady's death from cancer to grant hunting experiences to ill children; and Life Hunts, founded by the Buckmasters American Deer Foundation.

In popular culture
 In the 1997 made-for-TV movie A Child's Wish, Missy's wish is to go to the White House to meet the president who was responsible for signing the Family and Medical Leave Act of 1993 into law, which her father lobbied to pass after being fired for visiting Missy in the cancer ward. Make-A-Wish is not sure she will get to meet the president or be allowed to see the Oval Office, but in the end, President Bill Clinton, playing himself in a cameo appearance, meets her to make her wish come true.
 A 1997 sketch of the HBO series Mr. Show with Bob and David focuses on a knock-off of Make-a-Wish called "Dream of a Lifetime", an organization run by two men trying to offer a discount for families of ill children, but whose lack of resources or connections ends with one of them in prison.
 In the South Park episode "Kenny Dies", Make-A-Wish is satirized when they visit Kenny in the hospital and ask what his one wish is.  
 In the Family Guy episode "If I'm Dyin', I'm Lyin'", a parody of the Make-A-Wish called the Grant-a-Dream Foundation was presented.
 In January 2008, the satirical news site The Onion produced a parody video claiming that the Make-A-Wish was bankrupted due to a child's wish for "infinite wishes". The video was apparently so convincing that some people believed it to be real, and it had to be debunked by the urban legends website Snopes. The Mansion and The Chaser's War on Everything did similar sketches about the Make-A-Wish, the latter causing an unprecedented amount of controversy.
 In the 2008 feature film "New York, I Love You", an unnamed boy (played by Anton Yelchin) takes a girl who uses a wheelchair (played by Olivia Thirlby) to prom night. When they run into an ex-girlfriend and the situation gets awkward, the girl says "Make A Wish" to release the tension, suggesting the boy is granting her wish to attend prom night while being in a wheelchair. Later, she uses the sentence "Make A Wish" again, suggesting she wants the boy to make love to her.
 Make-a-Wish made headlines in 2013 with an elaborate Batman-themed wish, turning a young child into "Batkid". This wish was heavily publicized, and was chronicled in a documentary entitled Batkid Begins. In 2018 Batkid was considered to be cancer-free.
 In The Fault in Our Stars, a 2014 American romantic drama film, the character Augustus suggests that Hazel should use the "cancer wish" she received from "Genies" - a fictional organization just like Make-A-Wish - to travel to Amsterdam to visit her favorite author.
In a comedy sketch from the Key & Peele season 4 episode "Scariest Movie Ever", Jordan Peele portrays a dying child unsettling his doctor and a Make-a-Wish representative with increasingly disturbing "wishes", deliberately provoking the doctor into calling him a "devil child" and questioning his beliefs about "the essential goodness of children."
 In the episode "Infamous" of Ninjago, the ninja go to a hospital to fulfill a wish made by a hospital patient through the Grant-a-Wish Foundation, a reference to Make-a-Wish.
 In Zac & Mia, a 2017 American romance teen drama web television series based on the novel of the same name, the titular character Zac uses the wish he received from Make-A-Wish to recreate prom for Mia after she initially forgoes her own due to her embarrassment over her current medical condition.
 Four children were guest-stars on the show Cake Boss in 2017, in which Buddy Valastro helped the four children make one-of-a-kind cakes before making a hot air balloon cake for a reception for a Make-A-Wish event.
 In Survivor: San Juan del Sur, thirteen year-old Make-A-Wish child Austin Russell contributed a reward obstacle course as part of his wish.
In 2022, Disney Cruise Line chose to christen all Make-A-Wish foundation children as the Godchildren of the newest ship in the Disney fleet, the Disney Wish. Previously ships were named after female characters and role models such as Tinker Bell, Jennifer Hudson and Mariah Carey.

See also

 Disney Worldwide Outreach Program, a partner of the Make-A-Wish 
 Make a Film Foundation

References

External links

 Make-A-Wish of America
 Make-A-Wish International

Children's charities based in the United States
Organizations based in Phoenix, Arizona
Charities based in Arizona
Organizations established in 1980
1980 establishments in Arizona